Leptopentacta is a genus of sea cucumbers in the family Cucumariidae.

Species
The following species are recognised in the genus Leptopentacta:
Leptopentacta bacilliformis (Koehler & Vaney, 1908)
Leptopentacta grisea Clark, 1938
Leptopentacta imbricata (Semper, 1867)
Leptopentacta nina Deichmann, 1941
Leptopentacta nova Deichmann, 1941
Leptopentacta panamica Deichmann, 1941
Leptopentacta punctabipedia Cherbonnier, 1961

References

Cucumariidae
Holothuroidea genera